Eliezer "Eli" Gerstner (Hebrew: אליעזר גרסטנר), is an Orthodox Jewish singer, songwriter and producer.

Music career 
Gerstner began composing songs as a teenager. He produces albums of contemporary Jewish religious music under the name "EG Productions". He launched and produces the Yeshiva Boys Choir, The Chevra, Yosis Orchestra, Tek-Noy, Menucha, and Dovid Stein. He has produced the annual HASC A Time For Music concert since HASC 29 in 2016.

Personal life 
Gerstner was born in 1980. He is married with four children and lives in Brooklyn, New York.

Discography

Eli Gerstner
Hinei (1999)
Yosis (2001)
V'ishei Yisroel (2002)

The Chevra
The Chevra (2001)
Eli Gerstner & The Chevra Sing Acapella (2002)
The Chevra 2 (2004)
The Chevra 3 (2007)
Chai (2013)

Yeshiva Boys Choir

 Vol. 1: Kol Hamispalel (2003)
 Vol. 2: V'ohavta L'reiacha Kamocha (2005)
 YBC Live! (2005) (featuring Eli Gerstner and Menucha)
 Vol. 3: Shabichi (2007)
 YBC Live! II (2007) (featuring The Chevra, Tek-Noy, and Dovid Stein)
 Vol. 4: Sh'moy Shel Melech (2009)
 YBC Live! III (2009) (featuring Eli Gerstner, Menucha, Dovid Stein & Yaakov Mordechai Gerstner)
 Vol. 5: Chanukah (2010)
 YBC Live! 4 (2011) (featuring Eli Gerstner, Yaakov Mordechai Gerstner & Michoel Pruzansky)
 Amein: An A Capella Production (2012)
 Vol. 6: Modeh Ani (Thank You) (2014)
 Our Greatest Hits Live! Tour (2019)

Ben Klein
Benny K'ton (2003)
The Jewish Version NCSY (2008)

Menucha
Menucha (2003)
Sh'ma Yisroel (2010)

Yosis Orchestra 

 Yosis Orchestra & Singers (2004)

Tek-Noy 
Tek-Noy (2005) (The name of Tek-Noy is a Yiddish-sounding mispronunciation of "techno.")

Dovid Stein
Melech (2008)

References

External links
Eli Gerstner's website
Eli Gerstner in Israel 
Eli Gerstner presents: YBC 4
Interview by Matzav.com with Lipa Shmeltzer and Eli Gerstner 

Living people
American Orthodox Jews
Hasidic entertainers
Jewish American musicians
Hasidic singers
Yiddish-language singers of the United States
1980 births
People from Borough Park, Brooklyn